Henry Gunn Buckingham (April 12, 1887 – January 11, 1951) was an American football player and coach.  He served as the head football coach at the Colorado School of Mines in 1913, the University of Denver in 1914, and Santa Clara University from 1921 to 1922, compiling a career college football coaching record of 20–9–1.

Buckingham was a graduate of Princeton University and was the brother of Nash Buckingham.

Head coaching record

References

External links
 

1887 births
1951 deaths
American football ends
American football guards
Colorado Mines Orediggers football coaches
Denver Pioneers football coaches
Memphis Tigers football coaches
Princeton Tigers football players
Santa Clara Broncos football coaches